Creek Marina is an under-construction high rise ocean-front residential project located in DHA Karachi.

Launched in 2005 as a joint venture project between Meinhardt Group and DHA, while the masterplan was designed by Hirsch Bedner Associates. The project's masterplan includes eight 24-storey towers with a total of 780 apartments.

The development has been site of repeated delays, initially projected to be completed by 2009, conflicts between Meinhardt and DHA has stalled the project's development. Out of 780, 280 apartments were sold by 2010 for an average price of $200,000; in 2011, buyers formed an Action Committee to pursue for either a refund or completion of the project. On August 20, 2015, National Accountability Bureau brought charge's against Creek Marina Project management for cheating public at large.

See also
 Economy of Pakistan
 List of tallest buildings in Pakistan
 Defence Housing Authority
 Defence Housing Society

References

External links
 Official Website
 Meinhardt Engineering Consultants
 Pakistan Defence Officers Housing Authority

Neighbourhoods of Karachi
Defence, Karachi
Marinas in Pakistan
Apartment buildings in Pakistan